Kumarkhand is a town in  Madhepura district in the Indian state of  Bihar.  The block headquarters are located at a distance of 23 km from the district headquarters, namely, Madhepura.

Geography
Kumarkhand is located at

Panchayats
Panchayats in Kumarkhand community development block are: Bishanpur Sarhad, Bishanpur Bazar, Puraini, Parmanandpur, Lakshmipur Bhagwati, Ramnagar Mahesh, Tengraha Sikiyaha, Rauta, Tengraha Parihari, Sihpur Gadhiya, Lakshmipur Chandisthan, Rahta, Belari, Bishanpur Korlahi, Ranipatti Sukhasan, Kumarkhand, Israin Khurd, Mangarwara, Israni Bela, Israin kala and Baishadh.

Demographics
In the 2011 census Kumarkhand town had a population of 14,127.

See also
 Kumarkhand (Vidhan Sabha constituency)

References

Community development blocks in Madhepura district